The University Interscholastic League (UIL) is an organization that creates rules for and administers almost all athletic, musical, and academic contests for public primary and secondary schools in the U.S. state of Texas. It is the largest organization of its type in the world.

Activities range from American football and cross-examination debate to mathematics and marching band competitions; however, the UIL does not administer Academic Decathlon competitions.

The UIL is under the governance of the Vice President for Diversity and Community Engagement at the University of Texas at Austin in Austin, Texas. Although the Texas Education Agency governs the activities of schools and school districts in Texas, the UIL does not report to TEA, but is instead a separate entity.

History
The UIL was originally created by the University of Texas at Austin in 1910 as two different entities, the Debating League of Texas High Schools (to govern debating contests) and the Interscholastic Athletic Association (to govern athletic contests). The two entities merged in 1913 and adopted the UIL name.

At the time, UIL governed only white schools in Texas. From 1940 to 1970, an era of racial segregation in Texas, the Prairie View Interscholastic League (PVIL), headquartered at Prairie View A&M University, served as a separate parallel organization for African-American public high schools in Texas.

In 1965, the UIL agreed to admit PVIL member schools for competition. Black schools began UIL competitions beginning in the 1967–68 school year. After the 1969–70 school year, the UIL fully absorbed all PVIL member schools, the majority of which would later be merged with their white counterparts.

Beginning with the 2003–2004 academic year, two large all-male private schools, Dallas Jesuit and Houston Strake Jesuit, were granted UIL membership. This came after extensive court battles and negotiations from both the UIL's lawyers and the schools' joint lawyers. Previously, both schools were members of the now-defunct Texas Christian Interscholastic League (TCIL); after that league's demise and their inability to gain admittance into the Texas Association of Private and Parochial Schools (TAPPS) or Southwest Preparatory Conference (SPC), they decided to further pursue their decade-long battle of gaining membership into the UIL. They are so far the only private schools to be granted UIL membership, as the new UIL rules established after the Jesuit schools' entry prohibited those schools who were eligible for memberships in other similar associations (such as TAPPS or the SPC) to apply. 

The Texas Legislature rewrote titles 1 and 2 of the Texas Education Code and greatly restricted the functions to be performed by the Texas Education Agency and the UIL. The changes made Texas an equal access state. The law now requires the public schools to allow all students that reside within the school's boundary equal access to all activities. The Senate also made amendments that expressly regulate the UIL and invalidated certain UIL rules limiting student eligibility for competitions by providing that UIL rules would only apply to a student enrolled in the public school. The UIL no longer has the authority to determine the eligibility of Charter/Home/Private school students. 

All students must abide by the state No-Pass No-Play law. Only students that are enrolled in a public school must abide by UIL eligibility rules, even if the activity is not a UIL event.

In 1918, UIL excluded Private schools from membership after participation decreased significantly. Up to this time, private schools had competed in a separate Academy division from public schools. In 2003, rules were changed to allow some private or parochial schools to participate under certain circumstances when no other league is available to them. Other than this, membership in UIL is currently restricted to public schools and open-enrollment charter schools.

On October 10, 2010, the Third District Court of Appeals in Austin ruled that the UIL operates as a public organization and not a private organization. The ruling clarified that the UIL is legally considered a state agency and must comply with the prerequisites and duties that all other state agencies have. As a state agent the UIL must treat individuals equally and show the purpose/need as well as a rational basis for eligibility restrictions.

Organization
Activities for most Texas private schools are governed by separate bodies, the largest of which is TAPPS. However, private schools are allowed to join the UIL only if 1) they meet UIL's definition of a high school, 2) they are accredited by the Texas Private School Accreditation Commission, and 3) they are ineligible for membership in any league similar to UIL (such as TAPPS or the Southwest Preparatory Conference). Furthermore, private schools must compete at one classification higher than their enrollment would otherwise dictate. 
UIL schools are permitted to schedule contests with private schools and/or home school groups.

Charter schools must participate at no lower than the classification of the smallest high school in the district where the charter school resides; for example, a charter school within the Dallas ISD must participate in at least Class AAAA, as DISD has high schools which participate at this level.

Schools are arranged by conference to ensure that schools compete on a regular basis with other schools in the geographic area of a similar size. The conferences are A (the smallest), AA, AAA, AAAA, AAAAA and AAAAAA (the largest).  The corresponding alphanumeric designations (1A, 2A, 3A, 4A, 5A, and 6A) are used in everyday conversation (as well as in this article), but officially UIL only uses the alphabetic designations. The general guideline is that the UIL desires between 220 and 245 schools in Conference AAAAAA, at least 200 schools in Conferences AA, AAA, AAAA, and AAAAA with the grades 9–12 enrollment ratio for those classes no greater than 2.0 between the largest and smallest school in each class.

In addition, for football participation, a school whose enrollment is at or below 104.5 students may choose to play either six-man football (which, as of the 2014 alignment, is Conference 1A) or 11-man football (at Conference 2A). Schools with enrollments over 104.5 are only eligible for 11-man football; however, some schools organize a six-man team and play an "outlaw" schedule (i.e., the school is not eligible for the postseason). Moreover, for some events (such as team tennis or swimming and diving), the UIL organizes all participating schools into Conference 6A and Conference 5A, with the latter encompassing all schools not meeting the Conference 6A enrollment requirements.

Within each conference, the UIL separates the schools in regions, and then further separates the regions into districts for various contests. The districts are numbered from 1 (in far west Texas) to 32 (in south Texas). There are always 32 districts in Conference 6A and Conference 5A, but the smaller conferences may have numbers skipped based on the number of schools in the conference. No more than 10 schools are permitted in a single district unless all schools and the UIL consent otherwise; the preference is for an even number of schools in each district (6, 8, 10) though in some cases travel issues may prevent such.

Previously, schools were permitted to request to be placed in a higher conference than their enrollment would otherwise dictate, usually to play at a higher level of competition. The "play up" rule was later eliminated for competition reasons, but has been retained for geographic reasons (where playing at the current level would create a travel hardship for the school), and where school districts with eight or more high schools could keep all or most of them in the same conference. However, the school must then participate at the higher conference in all UIL events in which it does participate.

Each type of contest has different regions and competitors, as there is no requirement that a school participate in all UIL events – some small rural schools do not participate in football or choose six-man over 11-man, while some magnet schools do not field athletic teams but participate in academic events only.

Unlike the college ranks or other states, the regions and districts are not permanently set, but are redrawn biennially by the UIL behind closed doors in an attempt to keep schools of similar sizes within a certain distance of their geographic area when attending competitions, and to adjust for the changing enrollments of schools (moving schools with increased attendance up in conference and those with decreased attendance down) and new schools opening. The main redrawing of regions and districts takes place on February 1 of even-numbered years (and the final allocation, especially relating to high school football, is the subject of much pre-announcement anticipation and speculation as to which schools move up or down and the final composition of the districts), but as new schools open or smaller schools close or disband programs, interim adjustments can be made.

The changing districts and regions have produced unusual results – for example, the 2008-09 Conference 5A boys' basketball championship featured champion DeSoto from Region II defeating Cedar Hill from Region I, notwithstanding that the schools are in neighboring districts.

Playoff formats

Football
In Conference 6A, the top four teams from each district are eligible for the playoffs. The two eligible teams with the highest student enrollment for its district are seeded in the Division I playoff bracket, and the remaining two teams (with the lower enrollment) are seeded in the Division II playoff bracket. This method is supposed to prevent matchups between large and small schools within a classification, although in practice this is not always the case – for example, in the 2006 playoffs, Southlake Carroll (the Conference 5A Division I champion) had a lower student enrollment than Cedar Hill (the Conference 5A Division II champion).

For all other 11-man conferences and for six-man football, the UIL divides schools into separate Division I (large) and Division II (small) districts at its bi-annual redistricting session (in these cases, there are a maximum of 16 districts statewide, as opposed to the 32 in the larger conferences); separate playoffs are held for each division with the top four teams (top two in six-man) from each district eligible.

Other major team sports
In Conferences 6A and 5A, the top four teams from each district are eligible. However, the UIL does not use a Division I/Division II alignment as in football; only one champion and runner-up is crowned in each conference. A similar arrangement exists in Conferences 2A-4A, and for Conference 1A in all other team sports, only the top three teams are eligible.

For baseball and softball, at all levels except the state tournament, playoff rounds are best 2-of-3 only if both coaches agree; if they do not then the coaches flip a coin to decide the format of the playoff (single game or two out of three series). At the state tournament both the semifinals and finals are single-game format.

Academics and other sports
Advancement in these activities is dependent on the individual event involved.

One-Act Play Contest
The UIL One-Act Play contest is a competition where similarly sized Texas schools present an 18-40 minute play and may be adjudicated by a panel of three judges or a single judge. The contest is held on a single day and open to the public. There are six possible levels of competition: Zone, District, Bi-District, Area, Region, and State. At each level of competition a judge awards individual acting awards as well as selecting three productions to advance to the next level of competition up to the Regional Level where only two will advance to the State Level. After the awards are announced a Judge gives an oral critique to each of the schools. Because of the wide participation and diversity of plays produced certain rules and guidelines have been adopted by the State One-Act Play Office. These rules are in place to ensure safety, allow for equity, satisfy legal standards, and make the running of the contest practical.

Musical competition
In musical competitions, schools are aligned into 33 regions (the regions themselves are set not by the UIL, but by the Texas Music Educators Association). Schools of all sizes are grouped into a region.

Advancement within musical competition is not based on direct competition against other schools. Instead, musicians are compared against an established rubric (this is comparable to conformation dog shows where dogs compete against the written standard for their breed, not against other dogs of differing breeds), and all schools or individuals who are judged "Division 1" (the highest level) advance to the next level, except for state competition.

For marching band, schools compete against other schools in the same UIL conference. The 33 regions are grouped into nine areas (named A-I) for Conferences 5A and 6A, and five areas (A-E) for Conference 4A and down. All schools of all conferences compete in region and area competition annually, as a fall semester activity. However, in even-numbered years schools in Conferences 2A, 4A, and 6A can advance from region to area and state, and in odd-numbered years schools from Conferences 3A and 5A can advance from region to area and state, in addition to schools in Conference 1A may advance from region to state (There are no Area contests for Conference 1A, only for 2A and up). In order for bands to advance from Region to Area, they need to get an overall Division 1 from at least two Region judges, whether it be a 1-2-1, 2-1-1, 1-1-2, etc... the bands then will advance to the Area Competition. In order to make State, the band needs to make it to the Area Final competition AND make it to the top 3 bands (or 20% of all participating area bands if 20 or more bands are competing) to get to State. The Area and State champion is the school with the lowest ordinal score when the rankings from each judge are tabulated. For example, School 1 receives a first place score from three judges, a second place score from the fourth judge, and a fourth place score from the fifth judge. The ordinal score for School 1 is 9 (1+1+1+2+4). School 2 receives two first place scores and three second place scores. The ordinal score for School 2 is 8 (2+2+2+1+1). School 2 would be the champion despite receiving fewer first place scores because School 2's ordinal score is lower than School 1's. Thus, overall placement in the caption area for each judge is more important than the raw score awarded by the judge.

In all other musical competitions (held in the spring semester), conference alignments are disregarded except for the rules regarding sight reading. Advancement in solo and small ensemble competition is from region to state, and at state the top two soloists and top ensemble are awarded medals. Individual performers may be given Outstanding Performer awards.  However, advancement is limited not only to Division 1 winners, but the winners must have performed "Class 1" (difficult level) performances at region, and the performance must have been from a selection on the UIL's "Prescribed Music List" and also performed from memory (except for certain instrumental pieces which are designated as exempt from such on the List). In sight reading, schools in different conferences read different pieces, and second groups (officially called "non-varsity" groups) read different pieces from other conferences than the varsity group.

Sight Reading and medium ensembles compete at region level only. Music theory is held at state only and is open to any and all students in grades 9–12 having the permission of the school principal and school music director; the student is not required to have advanced from region in another musical contest (or even participated for that matter). Wind ensembles can advance from region to state; however, the state event is not a competition but an educational event.

Events

Athletics
Historically, football championship games have been held at neutral sites mutually agreed upon by both teams, but in 2006, 2007 and 2009, both Conference 5A championship games were played at the Alamodome in San Antonio. Frequent sites for those games included the Astrodome in Houston, Texas Stadium in Irving, Alamo Stadium in San Antonio and Darrell K Royal–Texas Memorial Stadium in Austin.

In 2010, the UIL designated sites for all championship games: the 5A, 4A, and 3A championships were held at AT&T Stadium in Arlington, while the 2A and 1A championships were held at Newsom Stadium in Mansfield and the six-man championships at Shotwell Stadium in Abilene. In 2011, Conferences 1A-5A played their state championships at AT&T Stadium, while the six-man games were played at Abilene. In 2013, the six-man games moved to AT&T Stadium as well. In 2015 the 11-man championships were played at NRG Stadium in Houston due to a conflict with a Dallas Cowboys-New York Jets game, while the six-man title games returned to Shotwell. All championship games returned to AT&T Stadium in 2016.

The state semifinal and championship games for all five classes in boys and girls basketball are held at the Frank Erwin Center on the campus of The University of Texas at Austin. In 2015 it was decided to move the Boys & Girls state tournaments to the Alamodome in San Antonio, TX, due to ongoing price and venue disputes in Austin. The state track and field meet and swimming championships are also held on the UT Austin campus, the former at Mike A. Myers Stadium and the latter at the Lee and Joe Jamail Texas Swimming Center.

The soccer semifinals and finals for 4A and 5A are held at Birkelbach Field in the Austin suburb of Georgetown, and the state baseball tournament is held at Dell Diamond in another Austin suburb, Round Rock. The state softball tournament is held at Red and Charline McCombs Field on the UT Austin campus. The state cross-country meet is held at Old Settlers Park in Round Rock. The state wrestling tournament is held at the Berry Center in Houston. The Conference 5A state golf tournament is held at Jimmy Clay Golf Course, a municipal course in Austin.

From 2000–2011 the girls' volleyball tournament was held in Strahan Coliseum on the campus of Texas State University in San Marcos. Since 2012, the tournament has been held at the Curtis Culwell Center in Garland.

Academics & Spring Meet
Though UIL is best known as the governing body for public school athletic competition, it also hosts numerous academic competitions as well, such as Math, Science, Ready Writing, Social Studies, and many others. Between athletics, music, theatre, spirit (cheer) and academics, UIL estimates that half of all public high school graduates have competed in at least one UIL-sanctioned event during their high school tenure.

The state level academic and speech competitions are held on the campus of The University of Texas at Austin, with the exception of Spirit/Cheer State Championship (Arlington, Texas), One-Act Play + Theatrical Design State Championships (Round Rock ISD Performing Arts Center) and UIL Young Filmmakers State Contest (Majestic Theatre - San Antonio, TX). The Student Congress state contest is typically held in the State Capitol Building.

For fine arts and journalism contests, the UIL has not adopted an "amateur rule.” Thus, students who have acted or performed professionally or who have written for a local newspaper may still compete in UIL-sanctioned contests provided they are otherwise eligible.

Participation
In the 2016–17 season, the University Interscholastic League featured 834,558 participants, with 59% boys and 41% girls.

The sports with most boys are:
 American football: 163,922
 Track and field: 71,741
 Basketball: 70,040
 Baseball: 47,845
 Soccer: 38,491
 Cross country athletics: 23,580

The sports with most girls are:
 Basketball: 67,400
 Track and field: 58,960
 Volleyball: 45,938
 Softball: 34,020
 Soccer: 30,583
 Competitive spirit squads: 25,000
 Cross country athletics: 23,706

Scholarship fund
Any student who competes at a state academic meet (at any high school grade) is also eligible to apply for a scholarship from the Texas Interscholastic League Foundation, an affiliate of UIL. The student must attend college in Texas full-time and meet certain grade requirements.

References

Further reading

External links
Official Website
UIL Archives – Past winners & results
UIL Football State Championship Games & Scores
UIL Constitution (Updated Annually)
List of all 28 UIL Music Regions website
To view recent years State Marching Band Results
UIL Music Archives - Past winners & results
Texas Tech University UIL (affiliated)
Sunset Review Commission on UIL

 
Music education organizations
Music conferences
Education in Texas
Organizations based in Austin, Texas
Texas classical music
Music education in the United States
Organizations based in Texas
Sports in Texas
1910 establishments in Texas